Little Tony (born Antonio Ciacci; 9 February 1941 – 27 May 2013) was a Sammarinese singer and actor, who achieved success in Britain in the late 1950s and early 1960s, as the lead singer of Little Tony & His Brothers, before returning to Italy where he continued a successful career as a singer and film actor.

Life and career
Little Tony was born in Tivoli, Italy, but was a citizen of San Marino, where his parents were born, and never applied for Italian citizenship. He formed a rock and roll group with his two brothers, Alberto and Enrico, in 1957, naming himself Little Tony in emulation of Little Richard.  The following year, the group were signed by Durium Records, who released a series of covers of American rock and roll songs by them in Italy.

In 1959, the Italian singer Marino Marini, when in London, recommended the group to TV pop show producer Jack Good.  Good visited Italy to meet the group, was impressed, and signed them up to appear in his British TV show Boy Meets Girls.  They made their first appearance on the programme in September 1959, and released their first single in the UK, "I Can't Help It" - the 11th single of their career in Italy - on the Decca label soon afterwards.  For their third British single, Good recorded the group in London for the first time, and the resulting single, "Too Good", written by Doc Pomus and Mort Shuman, reached # 19 on the UK singles chart in January 1960, their only chart success in Britain.  The group continued to appear regularly on TV shows in Britain until 1962.

The group first revisited Italy in 1961 to appear at the Sanremo Festival when they performed the song "24.000 baci" with Adriano Celentano and finished second, returning more permanently the following year. 
Little Tony then worked as a solo singer, having his first #1 in Italy with "Il ragazzo col ciuffo" in 1962. 
He began working as a movie actor, appearing in over 20 movies in Italy, and becoming a star in the musicarelli film genre.

He also continued to record regularly through the 1960s, one of his biggest hits from Festival Sanremo '1967 is "Cuore matto" (crazy heart), no. 1 for nine consecutive weeks in 1967. It sold in excess of about six million copies and was awarded a gold disc in May 1967. 
Another successful song was "Quando vedrai la mia ragazza", that he performed in Festival Sanremo  '1964, which sold almost one million copies, and later "Riderà", which sold over a million copies in 1966. 
He formed his own record label, Little Records, in 1969.

In Festival Sanremo 1969 Little Tony was singing the swing hit "Bada Bambina" (be careful baby) and in the following year, he participated in Festival Sanremo '1970 with the hit "La spada nel cuore" (sword in my heart) that became an international hit. 
In 1975 he recorded the album Tony canta Elvis, which pays tribute to Elvis Presley.

In the 1980s the three singers Rosanna Fratello, Bobby Solo, and Little Tony and formed the group "Ro Bo T".  In the late Eighties Little Tony was in America and recorded several songs with Diana Ross and the Supremes. In the 1990s and 2000s Little Tony participated in dozens of TV shows, particularly in Rai Uno and Canale 5, among others with the Italian superstars Gianni Morandi, Rita Pavone, Adriano Celentano, Mara Venier and many others.  He continued to record and perform successfully in Italy, despite suffering a heart attack during his show in Canada in 2006.

In 2008, Little Tony participated in the Sanremo Festival for the tenth time, with his hit "Non finisce qui". Little Tony also recorded a CD in that year with some other hits such as "Figli Di Pitagora".

Little Tony died of lung cancer on May 27, 2013, in Rome, at the age of 72 and was buried in Tivoli.

References

External links

1941 births
2013 deaths
People from Tivoli, Lazio
Sammarinese male singers
Italian rock singers
Italian male film actors
Italian people of Sammarinese descent
Rock and roll musicians
20th-century Italian  male singers
Deaths from lung cancer in Lazio